The Vedanga ("limbs of the Veda") are six auxiliary disciplines of Hinduism that developed in ancient times and have been connected with the study of the Vedas:

List of the Vedanga
Shiksha: phonetics, phonology, pronunciation. This auxiliary discipline has focused on the letters of the Sanskrit alphabet, accent, quantity, stress, melody and rules of euphonic combination of words during a Vedic recitation.
Chandas: prosody. This auxiliary discipline has focused on the poetic meters, including those based on fixed number of syllables per verse, and those based on fixed number of morae per verse.
Vyakarana: grammar and linguistic analysis. This auxiliary discipline has focused on the rules of grammar and linguistic analysis to establish the exact form of words and sentences to properly express ideas.
Nirukta: etymology, explanation of words, particularly those that are archaic and have ancient uses with unclear meaning. This auxiliary discipline has focused on linguistic analysis to help establish the proper meaning of the words, given the context they are used in.
Kalpa: ritual instructions. This field focused on standardizing procedures for Vedic rituals, rites of passage rituals associated with major life events such as birth, wedding and death in family, as well as discussing the personal conduct and proper duties of an individual in different stages of his life.
Jyotisha: Right time for rituals with the help of position of nakshatras and asterisms and astronomy. This auxiliary Vedic discipline focused on time keeping.

History and background
The character of Vedangas has roots in ancient times, and the Brihadaranyaka Upanishad mentions it as an integral part of the Brahmanas layer of the Vedic texts.
These auxiliary disciplines of study arise with the codification of the Vedas in Iron Age India.
It is unclear when the list of six Vedangas were first conceptualized.
The Vedangas likely developed towards the end of the Vedic period, around or after the middle of the 1st millennium BCE. 
An early text of the genre is the Nighantu by Yaska, dated to roughly the 5th century BCE.
These auxiliary fields of Vedic studies emerged because the language of the Vedic texts composed centuries earlier grew too archaic to the people of that time.  

Vedangas developed as ancillary studies for the Vedas, but its insights into meters, structure of sound and language, grammar, linguistic analysis and other subjects influenced post-Vedic studies, arts, culture and various schools of Hindu philosophy. The Kalpa Vedanga studies, for example, gave rise to the Dharma-sutras, which later expanded into Dharma-shastras.

See also
 Sruti
 Smriti

References

Bibliography

 Moritz Winternitz: Geschichte der Indischen Literatur, Leipzig, 1905 - 1922, Vol. I - III. English translation: History of Indian Literature, Motilal Barnarsidass, Delhi, 1985, Vol I - III

External links

"Vedanga" in the Hindu Encyclopedia

Indian philosophy
Vedas